The Anales de Tecamachalco or Annals of Tecamachalco is an anonymous Nahuatl-language historical manuscript held by the Benson Latin American Collection of the University of Texas.

Publication

See also
Lienzo Vischer I

Nahuatl literature